Raymond Moan (born 12 January 1951) is a former Irish first-class cricketer.

Moan was born at Carrigullen in County Tyrone in January 1951, and was educated nearby at Strabane High School. An all-rounder for several Irish club sides,  he played one first-class cricket match, aged nineteen, for Ireland against Scotland at Perth in 1970. He took one wicket with his off break bowling in the match, dismissing Terry Racionzer in Scotland's first-innings. Fellow off-spinner Michael Halliday debuted alongside Moan, with Halliday being preferred over Moan by the Irish selectors from thereon in. Moan later became a successful businessman.

References

External links

1951 births
Living people
People from Strabane
Cricketers from Northern Ireland
Irish cricketers